Du chant à la une !... is the debut studio album by French musician Serge Gainsbourg, released in 1958. This was the debut album for Gainsbourg, released on a 10" vinyl. The album did not do well with critics at the time of its release. However, the album did win the grand prize from the L'Academie Charles Cross in 1959.

Track listing

Source:

Personnel
Credits adapted from liner notes.

 Serge Gainsbourg – vocals
 Alain Goraguer and His Orchestre - orchestra
 Paul Rovère – double bass
 Christian Garros – drums
 Michel Hausser – vibraphone
 Alain Goraguer – arrangements, conductor, piano
Technical
Walter Carone - photography

Charts

References

External links
 
 

1959 debut albums
Serge Gainsbourg albums
Philips Records albums
French-language albums